Nauru was represented at the 1998 Commonwealth Games in Kuala Lumpur by a team consisting in six weight-lifters (Isca Kam, Kemp Detenamo, Gerard Garabwan, Marcus Stephen, Daniel Diringa, and Rodin Thoma) and one runner, Aneri Canon. Marcus Stephen, who became President of Nauru nine years later, competed for the third time and won his country's only medals of the 1998 Games. There were no female competitors for Nauru, by contrast with the 2002 Games, in which women won ten of Nauru's fifteen medals, including its two gold.

Medals

Medalists

Gold medalists
 Peter Erevu, Weightlifting, Men's 62 kg Clean and Jerk
 Marcus Stephen, Weightlifting, Men's 62 kg Combined
 Marcus Stephen, Weightlifting, Men's 62 kg Snatch

Silver medalists
none

Bronze medalists
none

Sources
 Official results

Sport in Nauru
Nauru at the Commonwealth Games
Nations at the 1998 Commonwealth Games
Com